M.G.R. Bus Stand, commonly known as Mattuthavani Bus Stand, is an integrated bus terminus in the city of Madurai, Tamil Nadu, India. This is the second-largest bus terminus in Tamil Nadu after Puratchi Thalaivar Dr. M.G.R. Bus Terminus in Chennai. It is one of the busiest bus terminals in south Tamil Nadu and one of the most important hubs in the state.

In 2003, increased traffic led the Madurai Municipal Corporation to construct a new mofussil bus terminus that would complement the existing Pazhanganatham and Anna bus stations. The government of Tamil Nadu renamed it M.G.R. Bus Stand on 31 October 2017 to honor AIADMK founder and former chief minister of Tamil Nadu M. G. Ramachandran (M.G.R.).
However, the change of name was not well received by the locals. It was also ambiguous since many bus stands and railway stations already bear the name of the late chief minister. The people trolled and criticized the change of name in social media.

Services 

Located on the outskirts of Madurai, the terminus has 8 platforms with 12 bays for every platform. The terminus is serviced by TNSTC, SETC, Kerala State Road Transport Corporation and Karnataka State Road Transport Corporation.

Omni Bus services 
Due to the heavy traffic of private omnibuses in Madurai, the municipal corporation constructed the Integrated Mofussil Omnibus Terminus for private omnibuses in 2014. It was opened by the then chief minister of Tamil Nadu J. Jayalalithaa on 12 February 2014. The new omnibus terminal, spread over 14.5 acres, was constructed at a cost of  rupees.

Facilities 
The bus station has an information center and ticket booking counters for TNSTC, SETC, KSRTC. Other facilities include, a police outpost, rest room for the crew, dispensary health unit, vending stalls, hotels, eateries and ATM. Parking and prepaid taxi, Rental cars, Auto Rickshaws are available.

See also 

 Transport in Madurai
 Madurai Junction
 Madurai International Airport

References 

Bus stations in Madurai